Heinz Tesar (born June 16, 1939 in Innsbruck) is an Austrian architect who has an international reputation for his church and museum architecture.

Life
Tesar studied architecture from 1961 to 1965 at the Akademie der bildenden Künste in the master class of Roland Rainer. After several stays in Hamburg (1959–1961), Munich (1965–1968) and Amsterdam (1971), he opened in 1973, his own studio in Vienna. From 1972 to 1977 he was a member of the Board of the Austrian Society for Architecture and from 2002 to 2006 he was a member of Baukollegiums of the  city of Zurich. In 2000 he opened an office in Berlin.

Academic career
Since the 1980s, he has taught at various universities in Europe and America:
  1983 Visiting Professor at Cornell University in Ithaca, New York
  1985–1987 Visiting Professor at the ETH Zurich
  1988 Visiting Professor at  Syracuse University, New York
  1990 Visiting Professor Graduate School of Design, Harvard University, Cambridge, Massachusetts
  1990–1991 Visiting Professor at the Technical University of Munich
  1992 Cass Gilbert Visiting Professor, University of Minnesota, Minneapolis
  1995  International Summer Academy in Salzburg
  1996–2000 Visiting Professor Istituto Universitario di Architettura di Venezia
  1997–1998 Visiting Professor University of Fine Arts Hamburg
   2000–2006 Visiting Professor Accademia di Architettura, University of Italian Switzerland, Mendrisio

Design competitions
For various international competition entries he has received the first or second prize: e.g. for Klösterliareal in Bern (1981), the University Library in Amiens (1991), the Synagogue in Dresden (1997), the Museum for Art and Design in Ingolstadt (2000) and the Museum of Medicine in Padua, Italy (2004).

Notable buildings

 1974–77 Music Studio, Steinach am Brenner
 1976–78 Unternberg Parish church.
 1977–86 Church and Cemetery, Wagrain
 1976–83, 1985–88 Residential Development, Vienna,
 1981–83 Firestation Perchtoldsdorf.
 1981–83 Haus Grass Bregenz.
 1981–85 Biberhaufenweg settlement, Vienna, (with Carl Pruscha and Otto Häuselmayer)
 1985–87 House Grobecker, Vienna,
 1986–87 Administration building Schömer, Klosterneuburg,
 1987–90 Day-care, residential complex Wienerberggründe, Vienna.
 1991 Design Koloman Walisch Square, Kapfenberg.
 1993–95 Keltenmuseum in Hallein
 1995 Evangelical Church, Klosterneuburg. [3]
 1995 Warehouse area, St. Gallen Styria,
 1995 ″Taschenberg Residence″ (Haus am Zwinger next to Taschenberg Palace), Dresden
 1998–99 Essl Collection Museum Klosterneuburg
 1999 Donau City Church of Christ, hope of the world in the Danube City Vienna.
 1999 Haus am Zwinger, Dresden
 2000–05 Conversion Bode Museum Kaiser Friedrich Museum, Berlin,
 2001–06 Teichgartencalvario, Klosterneuburg near Vienna,
 2001–06 BTV City Forum, Innsbruck,
 2007–08 Auditorium, Institute of Science and Technology Austria (ISTA), Klosterneuburg
 2013 Conversion of Kahlsperg Castle  for the Franciscan Sisters of Hallein [2]

References

External links

    
    
    "Kirchen – Wohnbauten – Museen". Der Architekt Heinz Tesar. In: Ö1-Menschenbilder, Sendung vom 4. Dezember 2011.
    Heinz Tesar Architekturausstellung in Tokyo 2008

Austrian architects
Architecture in Austria
Academic staff of ETH Zurich
Living people
1939 births
People from Innsbruck